Dwayne Sandy (19 February 1989 – 21 May 2021) was a football player for the Saint Vincent and the Grenadines national football team.

Sandy was killed on 21 May 2021.

Honors 
NLA Premier League Goalkeeper Of The Year: 2010–11

References

External links
 U20 Player profiles - Vincy Heat
  Club Page - Caledonia AIA

1989 births
2021 deaths
Association football goalkeepers
Saint Vincent and the Grenadines footballers
Saint Vincent and the Grenadines international footballers
Saint Vincent and the Grenadines expatriate footballers
Saint Vincent and the Grenadines expatriate sportspeople in Trinidad and Tobago
TT Pro League players
Morvant Caledonia United players
Avenues United FC players
Expatriate footballers in Trinidad and Tobago
People from Kingstown
Pastures F.C. players
Deaths by firearm in Saint Vincent and the Grenadines
People murdered in Saint Vincent and the Grenadines